Salvia eremostachya, the rose sage, sand sage, or desert sage, is a perennial shrub native to the western edge of the Colorado Desert. The flowers grow in whorled clusters, blooming from April to November.

The specific epithet, "eremostachya" (Greek for "desert stachys"), refers to the plants likeness to those of the genus Stachys.

References

External links
USDA Plants Profile
Jepson manual
Photo gallery

eremostachya
Flora of California
Flora without expected TNC conservation status